Jani Golob (born 18 January 1948 in Ljubljana) is a Slovenian composer, violinist, arranger and professor.

His music opus is often on the thin line of classic, pop and jazz. Golob has composed operas, ballets, orchestral works, chamber and vocal music, as well as numerous Slovenian film scores, and music for television and for advertising purposes. His most important works are probably three operas: Krpan's mare (1992), Medeja (1999) and Love Capital (2010); and others as Four Slovene Folk Songs (1979 and 2005), Concerto for violin and orchestra (1998) and ballet The Baptism at the Savica (1989). He is most recognized by his contribution in Slovenian popular music.

His internationally best-known piece of work is the unofficially named "Planica Slow Motion Theme" (1997), an instrumental piece of music played in slow motion replays annually on worldwide broadcasting of FIS Ski Jumping/Flying World Cup events from Planica, Slovenia. Especially because of this melody Golob became famous worldwide. Each year since 1997 this piece of music is played in Planica slow motion replays live to millions of people worldwide.

Other hit songs are "Prisluhni školjki/A Song In a Seashell" (1985), "Moja dežela/My Country" (1986) and "Pustite nam ta svet/Leave Us This World" (1987), popular especially in Slovenia. In 1971 he also arranged music for the song Sejem želja/Scarborough Fair with Slovenian lyrics of this original English folk ballad. He is the arranger of the most common used orchestrated version of the Slovenian national anthem "Zdravljica", used in protocol, sports and other big events.

In 1973 he acted in a film called Ljubezen na odoru (Love on the Furrows).

Golob is one of very few people who has the ability of absolute pitch. That is why when he was younger they used him to write music in notes just by listening and memorizing it.

Career
In the 1960s he founded Slovene pop band Delial, in which he played bass guitar. He studied violin with graduate education in 1971 and with musical composition in 1977 at the Ljubljana Academy of Music. At first he was mainly an arranger and later started writing his own compositions. From 1998 to 2000 he was professor of music composition and theory at the Academy for Theatre, Radio, Film and Television in Ljubljana (AGRFT). From then on he has been a professor of musical composition at the Ljubljana Academy of Music. Between 2002 and 2006 he was the president of Society of Slovene Composers.

Golob's compositions are performed by the most important Slovene ensembles and orchestras and also different important European artists, such as Slovakian State Philharmony Košice and Berlin Symphony Orchestra, with their conductors George Pehlivanian, En Shao, David de Villiers, and Carl Davis.

He was a member of many international music juries at various European festivals:
 Selector for music for the European Month of Culture EMK (1997)
 Representative of RTV Slovenia at the EBU work group for music (Eurovision, 1992-1998)
 Representative of RTV Slovenia at the International Music Centre in Vienna (1992-1998)
 Member of the international jury at Festival Prix Italia in Turin (1994)
 Member of the international jury at Festival Golden Prague in Prague (1996)
 Member of the European Academy of Sciences and Arts in Salzburg (since 1992)

His son Rok Golob is also a Slovene composer.

Awards and prizes
He has received many Slovenian and international awards in classic and in popular music:
 In 1977 he won the Prešeren Award of University of Ljubljana for "Concertino for big orchestra". 
 In 1978 in Bratislava he won third prize in the Grand Prix de Musique Folklorique de Radio Bratislava for "Sv. Sintilawdič".
 In 1983 he won the Župančič Prize for "Four Slovene Folk Songs for stings".
 In 1987 in Cannes he won the collective prize at the Prix National at the 34ème Festival du Film Publicitaire Cinema & Television Cannes for "The Guests are Coming", part of the project "Slovenia, My Country", and won the first prize for it at the festival of tourism short films in Berlin.
 In 2000 he won the Prešeren Fund Prize for "Violin Concerto".
 In 2012 he won the Kozina Award for lifetime achievements in music from the Society of Slovene Composers.

Selected works

Orchestral music

Vocal

Choral

Opera and ballet

Chamber music

Works for solo instruments

Television

Film scores

TV music

Hit singles

Discography
 Jani Golob - skladatelj, 1988 (LP)
 Glasba iz filma Poletje v školjki I. in II., 1986 (cassette)
 Sklicujem zborovanje, šansoni, 1987 (cassette)
 Pusti pevcu peti, Prešernove pesmi, 1991 (cassette)
 Pevca pesem sladka, Prešernove pesmi, 1991 (cassette)
 Škofjeloški pasijon, 1992 (double cassette)
 Jani Golob - skladatelj, 1994 (CD)
 Lepa Vida, glasba iz predstave, 1995 (CD)

References

External links
Jani Golob at the Society of Slovene Composers
Jani Golob at the Slovenian Film Databse

1948 births
Living people
20th-century classical composers
21st-century classical composers
Slovenian conductors (music)
Male conductors (music)
Slovenian classical violinists
Male classical violinists
Slovenian classical composers
Slovenian male musicians
Male classical composers
Slovenian film score composers
Male film score composers
Slovenian opera composers
Male opera composers
Musicians from Ljubljana
University of Ljubljana alumni
Academic staff of the University of Ljubljana
Members of the European Academy of Sciences and Arts
Slovenian jazz composers
20th-century conductors (music)
21st-century conductors (music)
21st-century classical violinists
Male jazz composers
20th-century male musicians
21st-century male musicians
20th-century jazz composers
21st-century jazz composers